Amadou Diop Guèye (born 10 November 1964) is a Senegalese judoka. He competed in the men's half-middleweight event at the 1992 Summer Olympics.

References

External links
 

1964 births
Living people
Senegalese male judoka
Olympic judoka of Senegal
Judoka at the 1992 Summer Olympics
Place of birth missing (living people)